Non-possessors (nestyazhateli) belonged to a 16th-century movement in the Russian Orthodox Church in opposition to ecclesiastical land-ownership.  It was led by Nil of Sora and later Maximus the Greek and others and was opposed to the Josephites led by Joseph of Volokolamsk and later Archbishop Theodosius II of Novgorod.  It was finally defeated at the Stoglav Council in 1551.

The non-possessors are similar to other movements in Christianity, the Spiritual Franciscans for example, in that they believed that ownership of land and the Church's possession of wealth in general had corrupted the church.  The non-possessors also believed that the Church should not forcibly convert or persecute heretics or pagans, but should patiently work to convert them to the true faith.

References

Christian movements
Russian Orthodox Church in Russia
History of the Russian Orthodox Church
Communalism